United Nations Security Council resolution 1560, adopted unanimously on 14 September 2004, after reaffirming all resolutions on the situation between Eritrea and Ethiopia, particularly Resolution 1531 (2004), the council extended the mandate of the United Nations Mission in Ethiopia and Eritrea (UNMEE) until 15 March 2005.

The resolution was adopted amid the continuing impasse in the Ethiopia-Eritrea peace process.

Resolution

Observations
The Security Council reaffirmed its support for the peace process between the two countries and of the role played by UNMEE in facilitating the implementation of the Algiers Agreement and decision by the Boundary Commission on the mutual border. It expressed concern at the impasse in the peace process and delays in the demarcation of the mutual border. There was concern that the commission could not conduct its work and the lack of co-operation from both Ethiopia and Eritrea with the United Nations in this regard.

Acts
The resolution extended UNMEE's mandate at a reduced strength until 15 March 2005. Both parties were urged to fulfil their commitments under the Algiers Agreement and co-operate with the Boundary Commission in order for it to fulfil its mandate. The parties were further called upon to co-operate with UNMEE and protect United Nations personnel. The council welcomed Ethiopia's decision to allow a direct air corridor between the capitals of Addis Ababa and Asmara to facilitate the work of the operation and called for the re-opening of the Asmara to Barent road.

The Council reaffirmed the importance of dialogue between the two countries and the normalisation of their diplomatic relations. Meanwhile, it supported the efforts of the Special Envoy Lloyd Axworthy to secure the implementation of their agreements. The Secretary-General Kofi Annan to closely monitor the situation and review UNMEE's mandate in light of any progress in the peace process.

See also
 Badme
 Eritrean–Ethiopian War
 List of United Nations Security Council Resolutions 1501 to 1600 (2003–2005)

References

External links
 
Text of the Resolution at undocs.org

 1560
2004 in Eritrea
2004 in Ethiopia
 1560
 1560
Eritrea–Ethiopia border
September 2004 events